The New York State Park Police (NYSPP), is the law enforcement agency of the New York State Office of Parks, Recreation and Historic Preservation.

Mission of the NYSPP

The New York State Park Police provides police services consistent with the Office of Parks, Recreation and Historic Preservation's mission-to provide safe and enjoyable recreational opportunities for New York State residents and visitors. In addition, the New York State Park Police assist park users, make arrests, conduct criminal and non-criminal investigations, and provide emergency services. New York State Park Police also provide special services including marine law enforcement and education duties on New York waterways, snowmobile enforcement and education, and rope rescue teams. New York State Park Police personnel are New York State police officers under paragraph e, subdivision 34, §1.20 of the state Criminal Procedure Law.

Organization

The New York State Park Police maintain law and order at 180 state parks and 35 state historic sites, covering nearly 335,000 acres (523 sq mi; 1,360 km2) of public lands and facilities, that are visited by over 78 million visitors each year.

The New York State Park Police are divided into 4 districts and 11 zones, serving 60 of New York State's 62 counties:

 Long Island/Metro District
 NYC Zone [Counties served: Bronx, Kings, New York, Queens, Richmond]
 Long Island Zone [Counties served: Nassau, Suffolk]
 Hudson Valley District
 Palisades Zone [Counties served: Orange, Rockland, Sullivan, Ulster]
 Taconic Zone [Counties served: Westchester, Putnam, Dutchess, Columbia]
 Saratoga/Capital Zone [Counties served: Albany, Fulton, Greene, Montgomery, Rensselaer, Saratoga, Schenectady, Schoharie, Warren, Washington]
 Mid-State District
 Central Zone [Counties served: Broome, Chenango, Cortland, Delaware, Herkimer, Madison, Oswego, Oneida, Onondaga, Otsego]
 Finger Lakes Zone [Counties served: Cayuga, Chemung, Ontario, Schuyler, Seneca, Steuben, Tompkins, Tioga, Wayne, Yates]
 Thousand Islands Zone [Counties served: Clinton, Franklin, Jefferson, Lewis, St. Lawrence]
 Western District
 Niagara Zone [Counties served: Erie, Niagara]
 Genesee Zone [Counties served: Genesee, Livingston, Monroe, Orleans, Wyoming]
 Allegany Zone [Counties served: Allegany, Cattaraugus, Chautauqua]
The uncovered areas, Catskill Park and Adirondack Park, are patrolled by the New York State Environmental Conservation Police.

Ranks and Insignia
There are eight sworn titles (referred to as ranks) in the New York State Park Police:

Uniforms

The uniforms of the NYSPP are very similar to those of the New York State Police. Their uniforms are a greyish blue and they wear black neckties.

Training
The State Park Police Academy is 27 week
long military style residential academy, similar to military
boot camp. It is characterized by paramilitary drills, daily
inspections, intense physical demands, discipline, and
rigorous training. Recruits typically report to the
academy each Sunday evening for the work week, and
then return home for the weekend.

Vehicles

New York State Park Police officers patrol in marked police cars, four-wheel drive vehicles, snowmobiles, all-terrain vehicles, bicycles, boats, personal water crafts, and in one region they ride horses.

Merger with State Police
As of late, there has been political debate concerning the New York State Park Police merging with the New York State Police. On December 3, 2019, Governor Andrew Cuomo announced that the New York State Park Police will merge with the New York State Police. The merger was expected to take about six months. In January 2022, officials announced that a merger would not happen.

See also

 List of law enforcement agencies in New York
 New York State Forest Rangers
 New York State Department of Environmental Conservation Police
 United States Park Police
 Park police

References

External links

 Police Benevolent Association of New York State

 New York State Park Police Benevolent Association

Specialist police departments of New York (state)
State law enforcement agencies of New York (state)
Environmental agencies in New York (state)
Park police departments of the United States